Mark IV of Alexandria may refer to:

 Pope Mark IV of Alexandria, ruled in 1348–1363
 Patriarch Mark IV of Alexandria, Greek Patriarch of Alexandria in 1385–1389